Atlético Morazán was a Honduran football club. It was based in Tegucigalpa, Honduras.

History
The club was promoted from the Second Division to the Liga Nacional on 23 December 1979. The club was known as Atlético Fusep at the time.

Juventud Morazánica
Atlético Morazán changed its name to Juventud Morazanica in 1983 after a merger with Juventud Ribereña.

Sula bought Juventud Morazanica's franchise in 1985.

Achievements
Liga Nacional
Runners-up (1): 1981–82

Segunda División
Winners (1): 1979

References

Defunct football clubs in Honduras
Association football clubs disestablished in 1985